is a paralympic athlete from Japan competing mainly in category T13 sprint events.

Tadashi competed in both the 100m and 200m at the 2000 Summer Paralympics but it was as part of the Japanese 4 × 100 m relay team that he won a silver medal.

References

Paralympic athletes of Japan
Athletes (track and field) at the 2000 Summer Paralympics
Paralympic silver medalists for Japan
Living people
Medalists at the 2000 Summer Paralympics
Year of birth missing (living people)
Paralympic medalists in athletics (track and field)
Japanese male sprinters
Visually impaired sprinters
Paralympic sprinters